is a diplomat of Japan who has served as the Japanese Permanent Representative to the United Nations since 10 June 2016, and as President of the United Nations Security Council in July 2016 and December 2017.

Career
Bessho was born in Hyōgo Prefecture and lived in New Zealand as an elementary and junior high school student. He graduated from Nada High School in Kobe and obtained an LL.B. from the University of Tokyo in 1975, thereafter joining the Ministry of Foreign Affairs. He worked in the Japanese Embassy in Washington D.C. from 1990 to 1993, and in 1995 was appointed head of the Northeast Asia Division of the Foreign Ministry. He served as Executive Secretary to Prime Minister Junichiro Koizumi from April 2001, and as Ambassador to the Republic of Korea from 2012 to 2016. 

As ambassador to South Korea, he made efforts to resolve the ongoing controversy between the two countries surrounding the comfort women issue. He received the ROK's highest diplomatic honor in 2016 for his work to improve Japan-Korea relations. Sankei Shimbun Seoul correspondent Katsuhiro Kuroda described Bessho as one of the "best five" of the fourteen Japanese ambassadors to South Korea since 1977, praising his English ability and his good relationship with the press.

As rotating president of the UN Security Council in July 2016, Bessho was responsible for tallying the ballots in the United Nations Secretary-General selection held that month.

References

External links 

1953 births
Living people
People from Hyōgo Prefecture
University of Tokyo alumni
Permanent Representatives of Japan to the United Nations
Ambassadors of Japan to South Korea